Andrés Gómez and Hans Gildemeister were the defending champions, but Gildemeister did not compete this year. Gómez teamed up with Ricardo Ycaza and lost in the quarterfinals to Heinz Günthardt and Balázs Taróczy.

Tomáš Šmíd and Pavel Složil won the title by defeating Anders Järryd and Hans Simonsson 6–4, 6–3 in the final.

Seeds

Draw

Finals

Top half

Bottom half

References

External links
 Official results archuve (ATP)
 Official results archive (ITF)

1982 Grand Prix (tennis)